Neil Agius (born June 6, 1986) is a Maltese swimmer, former Olympian and world-record holder who specialises in long-distance freestyle events. He held three Maltese records each in the 400, 800, and 1500 m freestyle until one of them was broken by Edward Caruana Dingli in 2011.

On June 30, 2021, Agius might have established the new world record for the longest continuous unassisted open water swim - swimming 125.7 km from Linosa to Xlendi - to the mediterranean archipelago of Gozo, Malta. This is still under review by the Marathon Swimmers Federation.

In August 2021, the renowned Maltese sportsman was honoured with the creation of a 266 kg bronze statue in his likeness, by artist Austin Camilleri, ensuring his legacy lives on.

Agius qualified for the men's 400 m freestyle at the 2004 Summer Olympics in Athens, by receiving a Universality place from FINA. He broke a Maltese record and posted his entry time of 4:21.24 from the Easter International Swim Meet in Msida. As part of his preparations for the Games, Agius attended a 6-week training camp under the guidance of Dave Heller, who coached for the Cardiff Swimming Club. On the first day of the Games, Agius placed forty-sixth from the morning's prelims. Swimming in heat one, he rounded out a field of seven swimmers to last place with a slowest time of 4:22.14, less than a tenth of a second (0.10) off his record.

References

External links
 

1986 births
Living people
Olympic swimmers of Malta
Swimmers at the 2004 Summer Olympics
Maltese male freestyle swimmers